Ropata Te Ao (died 23 April 1908) was a nineteenth-century Māori member of the House of Representatives.

His father was Te Aotuta-hanga and his mother was Te Raute. Te Ao was an elder of the Ngāti Raukawa tribe and lived in Ōtaki on the Kapiti Coast.

He represented the Western Maori electorate from 1893 after the retirement of Hoani Taipua, to 1896 when he was defeated by Henare Kaihau. He was related to Te Puke Te Ao, who had represented the Western Maori electorate from  until his death in 1886.

Te Ao died on 23 April 1908.

References

New Zealand MPs for Māori electorates
Members of the New Zealand House of Representatives
Year of birth unknown
People from Ōtaki, New Zealand
1908 deaths
19th-century New Zealand politicians